Kondik is a rural locality (a selo) and the administrative centre of Kondiksky Selsoviet, Khivsky District, Republic of Dagestan, Russia. The population was 1,457 as of 2010.

Geography 
Kondik is located 9 km northwest of Khiv (the district's administrative centre) by road. Tsuduk is the nearest rural locality.

References 

Rural localities in Khivsky District